The Lithuania women's national handball team is the national handball team of Lithuania and takes part in international team handball competitions..

Results

World Championship
1993 – 13th

European Championship
1996 – 12th

External links

IHF profile

National team
Handb
Women's national handball teams